Mavis Hawa Koomson (born 3 February 1966) is a Ghanaian politician and educationist. She is the Member of Parliament for Awutu Senya East Constituency and doubles as the Minister of Special Development Initiatives. She was appointed by President of Ghana Nana Akuffo-Addo on 10 January 2017 as Minister of Special Development Initiatives.

Early life and education 
Koomson hails from Salaga in the Savannah Region of Ghana and was born on 3 February 1966. She had her training college education at the Bimbilla Training College. She holds a diploma and a bachelor's degree in Basic Education from the University Education Winneba. She has earned a master's degree, postgraduate diploma in public administration (CPA) and postgraduate diploma in public administration (DPA) from Ghana Institute of Management and Public Administration (GIMPA).

Career 
Koomson was a teacher by profession, occupying various positions including head teacher, assistant superintendent and Principal superintendent. She was also president of Gender Unit of the Ghana National Association of Teachers Ladies Association (GNATLAS) Sekondi local, treasurer for GNATLAS (Western Region) and secretary for GNATLAS (Takoradi local).

Politics 
Koomson is a member of the New Patriotic Party. She is currently the Member of Parliament for Awutu Senya East Constituency in the Central Region of Ghana.

Cabinet minister 
In May 2017, President Nana Akufo-Addo named Mavis Hawa Koomson as part of nineteen ministers who would form his cabinet. The names of the 19 ministers were submitted to the Parliament of Ghana and announced by the Speaker of the House, Rt. Hon. Prof. Mike Ocquaye. As a Cabinet minister, Mavis Hawa Koomson is part of the inner circle of the president and is to aid in key decision-making activities in the country. She is currently the Minister for Fisheries and Aquaculture Development.

2020 elections 
In the 2020 Ghanaian general elections, she won the Awutu Senya East Constituency parliamentary seat with 57,114 votes making 52.6% of the total votes cast whilst the NDC parliamentary candidate Phillis Naa Koryoo Okunor had 51,561 votes making 47.5% of the total votes cast, the GUM parliamentary candidate Hanson Ishmael Amuzu had 0 vote making 0.0% of the total votes cast, the CPP parliamentary candidate Addy Ishmael had 0 vote making 0.0% of the total votes cast, the GCPP parliamentary candidate Peter Kwao Lartey had 0 vote making 0.0% of the total votes cast and the UPP parliamentary candidate Mohammed Issah Al-Marzuque had 0 vote making 0.0% of the total votes cast.

Committee 
Koomson is a member of the Business Committee.

Controversy 
In July 2020, Hawa Koomson breached security laws and fired gunshots into a crowd of citizens who were in the process of registering for the controversial voters ID card. This incident occurred in Kasoa. The Minister claimed she was informed of foreigners who had come from different towns to register in her constituency. She regarded this as a threat to her party's victory in the upcoming elections. The Minister claimed that the act was in self-defense because she felt threatened. She responded to the invitation of the CID of the police in the Central region. Her gun was retrieved by the Central Regional police. The license covering the weapon was also retrieved when she reported to the police in Cape Coast.

Personal life 
She is a Christian and is married with three children.

Philanthropy 
She introduced an annual soccer competition dubbed the Kasoa MP's Cup among the youth in her constituency.

In 2021, Koomson constructed a church hall for the Bethel Methodist Church in Kasoa.

References 

1966 births
Living people
Cabinet Ministers of Ghana
21st-century Ghanaian women politicians
Ghanaian MPs 2017–2021
Women government ministers of Ghana
Women members of the Parliament of Ghana
New Patriotic Party politicians
University of Education, Winneba alumni
Ghanaian MPs 2021–2025